Princess Paley was a Russian noble title that was created in 1915 by Tsar Nicholas II of Russia. It was first bestowed upon Olga Valerianovna Karnovich, Countess von Hohenfelsen, the morganatic second wife of Grand Duke Paul Alexandrovich of Russia. The style of Serene Highness accompanied the title, which was also used by the two daughters of Princess Olga's marriage with Grand Duke Paul Alexandrovich. 

Three women have been known by this title:
 Princess Olga Valerianovna Paley (1866–1929)
 Princess Irina Pavlovna Paley (1903–1990), Princess Olga's elder daughter
 Princess Natalia Pavlovna Paley (1905–1981), Princess Olga's younger daughter

See also
 Prince Paley

References 

Princes Paley
Paley

ru:Князья Палей